Sasha Compère is an actress known for her roles in the television shows Miracle Workers and Love Life, and in the film Uncorked.

Early life and education
Sasha Compère was born in Detroit, Michigan, the daughter of immigrants from Haiti.  She began performing theater in high school and continued while studying at The University of Michigan, where she received a Bachelors in Business Administration and a minor in Dramatic Arts.

Career
Compère's breakthrough role was as a series regular, Laura Greene, on season one of the TBS comedy Miracle Workers. Prior to getting that role, Compère worked as a building manager. She said the role on Miracle Workers "changed my life."

Other prominent credits include a recurring character on the HBO show Love Life, starring Anna Kendrick, and a role in the Netflix film Uncorked, starring Mamoudou Athie and written and directed by the show runner for HBO's Insecure, Prentice Penny. Critic Pete Hammond called Compère "perfectly cast" in the film.

In February 2021, Compère was announced as a series regular in the upcoming comedy series Single Drunk Female to air on Freeform.

Selected filmography 
 Ad Astra as Lieutenant Coleman (2019)
 Uncorked as Tanya (2019)

Selected television 
 Dead Girl's Detective Agency as Ali (2018) 
 Reverie as Casey Hathaway (2018)
 Miracle Workers as Laura Greene (2019)
 Love Life as Mallory Moore (2020)
 Single Drunk Female as Brit (2022)

References

External links 
 
 

21st-century African-American people
21st-century American actresses
American people of Haitian descent
Actresses from Michigan
Year of birth missing (living people)
Living people
American film actresses
American television actresses
Ross School of Business alumni
21st-century African-American women